Pennsylvania State Senate District 17 includes parts of Delaware County and Montgomery County. It is currently represented by Democrat Amanda Cappelletti.

District profile
The district includes the following areas:

Delaware County
 Haverford Township
 Radnor Township

Montgomery County
 Bridgeport
 East Norriton Township
 Lower Merion Township

Montgomery County(continued)
 Narberth
 Norristown
 Upper Merion Township
 West Conshohocken
 West Norriton Township

Senators

Recent election results

References

Pennsylvania Senate districts
Government of Delaware County, Pennsylvania
Government of Montgomery County, Pennsylvania